Jessie's Jig & Other Favorites is an album by singer/songwriter Steve Goodman, released in 1975. It was Goodman's first release on Asylum Records. Guests include Jethro Burns and Vassar Clements.

Reception

Robert Christgau assigned it a "B" rating, indicating "Very likable, bright and open and good humored, but like so many solo performers, folkies especially, he can't fill an album... his talent requires mood changes more conspicuous than so subtle an instrumentalist, or so thin a vocalist, can provide." In reviewing the 1999 reissue, Allmusic critic Sharon Witmer wrote "The title cut is a rousing number on which Goodman is joined by a stellar cast of musicians... sounds like an old-timey hoedown. It did Steve Goodman proud and is a fitting way to remember this ephemeral, but brilliant shooting star in the musical firmament."

Track listing
"Door Number Three" (Jimmy Buffett, Steve Goodman) – 3:40
"Blue Umbrella" (John Prine) – 3:54
"This Hotel Room" (Goodman) – 3:36
"Spoon River" (Michael Peter Smith) – 4:52
"Jessie's Jig (Rob's Romp, Beth's Bounce)" (Goodman, Bill Swofford) – 2:22	
"It's a Sin to Tell a Lie" (Billy Mayhew) – 2:08
"I Can't Sleep" (Goodman) – 3:57
"Moby Book" (Goodman, David Amran) – 3:10
"Lookin' for Trouble" (Goodman) – 4:38
"Mama Don't Allow It" (Sammy Cahn, Cow Cow Davenport) – 4:35

Personnel 
Steve Goodman – vocals, guitar
Jethro Burns – mandolin
Vassar Clements – fiddle
Carl Martin – mandolin, backing vocals
Hugh McDonald – bass, double bass
Howard Armstrong – fiddle
Ted Bogan – guitar
Sheldon Plotkin – drums, percussion
Bill Swofford – guitar, backing vocals
Winnie Winston – banjo, pedal steel guitar
Saul Broudy – harmonica, harp
Steve Burgh – guitar
John Burns – guitar
Jeff Gutcheon – piano, keyboards
Diane Holmes – backing vocals
Bonnie Koloc – backing vocals
Raun MacKinnon – backing vocals
Jack the Bear – trumpet
Ken Bloom – clarinet
Abby Newton – cello

Production
Steve Goodman – producer, mixing
Hank Neuberger – engineer
Glen Christensen – art direction
Henry Diltz – photography

References

Steve Goodman albums
1975 albums
Asylum Records albums